Vincent Apap, OBE (13 November 1909 – 15 February 2003) was a Maltese sculptor who is well known for designing various public monuments and church statues, most notably the Triton Fountain in Valletta. He has been called "one of Malta's foremost sculptors of the Modern Period" by the studio of Renzo Piano.

Biography

Apap was born in Valletta in 1909, and he was the older brother of the musician Joseph Apap and the painter William Apap. He attended the government central school, and in 1920 he began to attend evening classes in modelling and drawing. He was one of the first students to enroll in the newly established School of Art in 1925, where he studied sculpture under Antonio Micallef. In 1927, he won a scholarship to the British Academy of Arts in Rome, studying under the renowned Maltese sculptor Antonio Sciortino.

He returned to Malta in 1930, and soon afterwards he won his first commission, the Fra Diego monument in Ħamrun. This made him well known within Malta's art scene, and he regularly exhibited his works at the Malta Art Amateur Association exhibitions throughout the 1930s. He was appointed assistant modelling teacher at the School of Art in 1934, becoming head of school in 1947. He remained there until his retirement in 1971, but was recalled seven years later in 1978.

Patrons of Apap's work included the Lieutenant Governor of Malta Sir Harry Luke as well as Lord Mountbatten, whose family still has some of Apap's best sculptures. In the 1960s, two exhibitions of his and his brother William Apap' work were held in London.

Apap's best-known works include various public monuments in Valletta, such as the Triton Fountain (1959), the bust of Enrico Mizzi (1964), the statue of Paul Boffa (1976) and the statue of George Borg Olivier (1990). His last major work was a bust of Guido de Marco which was completed when he was 89 years old. The motifs of the theatre at Palazzo Carafa in Valletta were designed by Apap.

Apap married Maria Bencini in 1941, and they had three children: John, Nella and Manon. He died in 2003 at the age of 93.

Awards and honours

Member of the Order of the British Empire (1956)
Gold medal of the Society of Arts, Manufacture and Commerce (1965)
Cavaliere Ufficiale Repubblica Italiana (1968)
Order of Merit (1993)
He was nominated a knight of the Sovereign Military Order of Malta in 1963.

References

1909 births
2003 deaths
People from Valletta
20th-century Maltese sculptors
Knights of Malta
Members of the Order of the British Empire
Recipients of the National Order of Merit (Malta)